Nathan McGinley (born 15 September 1996) is an English professional footballer who plays as a left-back for Scottish Premiership club Motherwell.

Club career

Middlesbrough
McGinley signed his first professional contract with the club on 1 July 2015. He made his debut for the club on 14 August 2018, in a 3–3 draw with Notts County in the EFL Cup, with Middlesbrough advancing via a penalty shoot-out.

Wycombe Wanderers loan
On 13 January 2018, BBC Sport reported that the versatile defender had joined Wycombe Wanderers on loan for an indeterminate period of time, after he made his first appearance for the club earlier that day at Adams Park in a 3–1 victory over Colchester United. McGinley tweeted after the match that he had joined the club until the end of the 2017–18 season.

Forest Green Rovers
Shortly after making his debut for Middlesbrough, McGinley joined Forest Green Rovers on loan until January 2019, with an option to sign permanently on an 18 month contract after the fact. On 4 January 2019, McGinley signed permanently for Forest Green Rovers after proving himself a key part of the team during his initial loan.

Motherwell
On 15 June 2020, Motherwell announced the signing of McGinley on a two-year deal after his contract with Forest Green Rovers had expired.

On 24 February 2022, McGinley extended his contract with Motherwell until the summer of 2024.

Career statistics

References

1996 births
Living people
Footballers from Middlesbrough
English footballers
Association football fullbacks
Association football central defenders
Middlesbrough F.C. players
Wycombe Wanderers F.C. players
Forest Green Rovers F.C. players
Motherwell F.C. players
English Football League players
Scottish Professional Football League players